Construction and exploitation of stadiums and other football infrastructure in Ukraine as well as providing safety in conducting competitions is being supervised by the respected UAF (previously FFU) standing committee. The Ukrainian Association of Football itself adopts regulations on infrastructure of stadiums and measures of safety.

Previously all stadiums in Ukraine were awarded certain category: 1, 2, 3, and elite. All professional clubs are obligated to conduct their "home games" in place of their permanent location and state registration and on stadiums that correspond to the FFU regulations. A football game is held only on a stadium that was applied by the club during its attestation for respectful competition season. Such stadiums are listed in a stadium registry on which permitted to conduct matches of respected level. Each stadium has a certificate of state commission and passport.

In 2020, the UAF revamped its stadium categorization to synchronize with same requirements as the UEFA. It published new list of stadiums and its categorization.

Football stadiums with a capacity of at least 25,000

Football stadiums with a capacity below 25,000 

A minimum capacity of 10,000 is required.

List by UAF categories
The following is a list of football stadiums in Ukraine, ordered by capacity.

Category Four
Any games (domestic and international)

Category Three
Any domestic games (UPL, finals of Cup or Super Cup)

Category Two
Any domestic games beside the UPL, Super Cup or Cup competitions quarter, semi or finals.

Category One
Any games beside the UPL, First League, or Cup competitions (main stages, + finals), including certified training fields

List by regions/oblasts
 Autonomous Republic of Crimea: none available
 Cherkasy Oblast: Cherkasy Arena (Tsentralnyi Stadion (Cherkasy), cat 3), Central Stadium, Uman (cat 1), Zoria Stadium, Biloziria (cat 1)
 Chernihiv Oblast: Yuri Gagarin Stadium (Chernihiv Stadium, cat 3), Yunist Stadium (Chernihiv) (cat 2), Chernihiv Arena (cat 1)
 Chernivtsi Oblast: Bukovyna Stadium (cat 2), Malva Stadium (cat 1)
 Dnipropetrovsk Oblast: Dnipro-Arena (cat 4), Meteor Stadium (cat 3), Dnipro Training Center, indoor field (cat 1), Olimpiyski Rezervy Stadium (cat 1), Shakhta Zhovtneva Stadium (cat 1), Elektrometalurh Stadium (cat 1), Kolos Stadium, Chkalove (cat 1)
 Donetsk Oblast: Volodymyr Boiko Stadium, Mariupol (cat 3), Bliuminh Stadium, Kramatorsk (cat 2), Prapor Stadium (Kramatorsk) (cat 2), Sportkompleks Illichivets, Mariupol (cat 1), Zakhidnyi Stadium, Mariupol (cat 1), Azovets Stadium, Mariupol (cat 1), Mariupol Training Center (cat 1)
 Ivano-Frankivsk Oblast: MCS Rukh (cat 2), Enerhetyk Stadium, Burshtyn (cat 1)
 Kharkiv Oblast: Metalist Stadium (cat 4), Sonyachny Stadium, Kharkiv (cat 2), Dynamo Stadium (Kharkiv) (cat 1), Nova Bavaria Stadium (Helios Arena (Kharkiv), cat 1), Metalist Training Center, Vysokyi (cat 1), Avanhard Stadium, Zmiiv (cat 1)
 Kherson Oblast: Olimpiyskyi Stadium, Kakhovka (cat 1), Krystal Stadium, Kherson (cat 1), Enerhiya Stadium, Nova Kakhovka (cat 1), Marianivskyi Stadium (cat 1), Zatys Stadium, Hornostaivka (cat 1)
 Khmelnytskyi Oblast: Sport Complex Podillya (cat 2), Yunist Stadium, Volochysk (cat 2), Kolos Stadium, Dunaivtsi (cat 1)
 Kyiv City and Oblast: Olimpiyskiy National Sports Complex (cat 4), Lobanovsky Dynamo Stadium (cat 3), Obolon Arena (cat 3), Kolos Stadium (Kovalivka) (cat 3), Bannikov Stadium (cat 2), Livyi Bereh Stadium (cat 2), Trudovi Rezervy Stadium, Bila Tserkva (cat 1), Temp Stadium, Kyiv (cat 1), Dynamo Training Center, indoor (cat 1), Dynamo Training Center, pitch #6 (cat 1), Dynamo Training Center, pitch #7 (cat 1), Kolos Stadium (Boryspil) (cat 1), Yuvileinyi Stadium, Bucha (cat 1), Central City Stadium, Irpin (cat 1), Central Stadium, Kalynivka (cat 1), Tsentralnyi Stadion im.Brukvenka, Makariv (cat 1), Volodymyr Melnyk Stadium, Obukhiv (cat 1), Arsenal Arena, Shchaslyve (cat 1), Dinaz Stadium (cat 1)
 Kirovohrad Oblast: Zirka Stadium (cat 3), CSC Nika Stadium (cat 3), Inhulets Stadium (cat 2), Oleksandr Povorozniuk Stadium (cat 1), HOLovkivskyi Stadium (cat 1), Olimp Stadium (cat 1)
 Luhansk Oblast: none available
 Lviv Oblast: Arena Lviv (cat 4), Ukraina Stadium (cat 3), Skif Stadium (cat 2), Shkoliar Stadium (cat 1), Sokil Stadium, Lviv (cat 1), Sokil Stadium, Stryi (cat 1), Lokomotyv Stadium, Rava-Ruska (cat 1), Enerhetyk Stadium, Dobrotvir (cat 1), Stadion imeni Bohdana Markevycha (cat 1), Medyk Stadium (cat 1)
 Mykolaiv Oblast: Tsentralnyi Stadion (Mykolaiv) (cat 3), Park Peremohy Stadium (cat 2), Tsentralnyi Stadion (Mykolaiv), upper pitch (cat 1)
 Odessa Oblast: Chornomorets Stadium (cat 4), Spartak Stadium (Odessa) (cat 1), Borys Tropanets Stadium (cat 1), Ivan Stadium (cat 1), Liustdorf Stadium (cat 1)
 Poltava Oblast: Oleksiy Butovsky Vorskla Stadium (cat 4), Kremin Stadium (cat 2), Yunist Stadium (Horishni Plavni) (cat 2), Vorskla-Zmina Stadium (cat 1), Ltava Stadium (cat 1), Lokomotyv Stadium (Poltava) (cat 1), Mashynobudivnyk Stadium (cat 1)
 Rivne Oblast: Kolos Stadium, Mlyniv (cat 2), Kolos Stadium, Berezne (cat 1), Izotop Stadium (cat 1)
 Sumy Oblast: Naftovyk Stadium (cat 2), Yuvileiny Stadium (cat 2), Alians-Arena (cat 1), Viktoriya Stadium (cat 1), Volodymyr Kuts Stadium (cat 1)
 Ternopil Oblast: Ternopilsky Misky Stadion (cat 3)
 Vinnytsia Oblast: Tsentralnyi Stadion (Vinnytsia) (cat 1), Sports Complex Nyva (cat 1)
 Volyn Oblast: Avanhard Stadium (Lutsk) (cat 3), Pidshypnyk Stadium (cat 1)
 Zakarpattia Oblast: Avanhard Stadium (Uzhhorod) (cat 3), Mynai Arena (cat 2)
 Zaporizhzhia Oblast: Slavutych Arena (cat 4), JSC ZAZ Stadium (cat 1), Metalurh Training Center (cat 1)
 Zhytomyr Oblast: Spartak Arena (cat 1), Central City Stadium Spartak (cat 1)

List of uncertified football stadiums

Others
Non certified sports facilities

The UAF notable stadiums located in the Russian occupied territories
Sports facilities with unidentified status

Gallery

The UAF stadium basic requirements
Categories to all UAF stadiums are granted with consideration of all circumstances and data about a stadium and if it corresponds to FIFA, UEFA and UAF requirements (2020 UAF Regulations on stadium infrastructure. Article 3.2).

Basic criteria for each stadium (2020 UAF Regulations on stadium infrastructure. Article 3.7):
 must have developed and approved in the manner prescribed by law a strategy of insuring a public order and public safety, rules (instructions) of observance of public order and public safety (including rules of spectator behavior), evacuation plan
 must have rooms (no less than two) functioning as a post of urgent or first medical aid with the necessary equipment and easy access from the building premises and the surrounding area
 must provide a clear distribution of seats for spectators into separate parts (sectors)
 must have a separate box (lounge) for honored guests (Luxury box) with a separate entrance
 must be equipped with a video surveillance system over the territory of the structure and adjacent territories as well as technical measures of recording the results of video surveillance
 must be equipped with a public announcement
 must be equipped with a control room with the ability to control the video surveillance system, telephone signal and loud speaking systems
 must be equipped with information screen and stands with rules of spectator behavior, evacuation plan (in state and most common foreign language)
 must provide routes for special equipment, including vehicles of the National Police, ambulance and the State Service of Emergency Situations units, as well as places for their parking
 must have the equipment necessary to use an electronic ticket, including a turnstile system
 must have storage rooms or storage chambers for items prohibited for carrying into the building, in case of their seizure
 must have rooms for FIFA, UEFA, UAF official representatives and supervisor in refereeing (officials)
 must have a room for the National Police operations and a separate room for temporary detention of offenders during a football match
 must have premises for the coordination headquarters
 must be equipped with serviceable fire protection systems, fire barriers, primary fire extinguishing measures, standard number of sources of fire water supply, lightning protection and safety signs

In order to ensure public order and public safety in accordance with the law, other criteria may also be established for sports facilities.

See also
List of European stadiums by capacity
List of association football stadiums by capacity

References

External links
 Regulations on stadium infrastructure. Football Federation of Ukraine. 5 June 2013.
 Regulations on stadium infrastructure. Football Federation of Ukraine. 2020.
 The UAF confirmed the list of Ukrainian stadium in four categories (УАФ утвердила список стадионов Украины по четырем категориям). UA-Football. 24 July 2020.
 UEFA Guide to Quality Stadiums. UEFA. 2011
 UEFA Stadium Infrastructure Regulations. UEFA.

 
Ukraine
Stadiums
Football stadiums